WMDV-LD, virtual and UHF digital channel 23, is a low-power independent television station licensed to Danville, Virginia, United States, and also serving Pittsylvania, Halifax and Henry counties. Owned by the Star News Corporation, it is sister to fellow independent station WGSR-LD in Reidsville, North Carolina. WMDV-LD's transmitter is located atop White Oak Mountain south of Chatham, Virginia.

Under former owners Tri-State Christian Television (TCT), the station aired the schedule of full-power Christian station WLXI-TV from Greensboro, North Carolina. Star News re-launched the station as an independent station serving the cities of Martinsville and Danville.

History
The station first broadcast in 1993 as W18BG. The majority of its programming was provided by the Trinity Broadcasting Network through WLXI. This arrangement ended in April 2007 when TCT replaced TBN programming with its own programming for all of its stations.

In November 2008, TCT decided to divest itself of its Danville translator. In June 2009, TCT passed ownership of W18BG to Star News, which temporarily took the station dark. In early May 2010, the Federal Communications Commission (FCC) issued the construction permit to build the station on RF channel 45, with a virtual channel number of 44 since Winston-Salem, North Carolina ABC affiliate WXLV-TV uses 45 as its virtual channel.

The station's callsign was changed to WMDV-LP on October 9, 2009. WMDV-LP returned to the air on the afternoon of May 26, 2010, after about 50 weeks of being dark.

Technical information

Subchannels
The station's digital signal is multiplexed:

2017 auction and repack
In 2017, the FCC authorized the auction of TV channels 38 and above, and the subsequent relocation of all TV stations operating on those channels to new locations below channel 37. On September 1, 2018, WMDV-LD ceased broadcasting on channel 45 and commenced operation on RF channel 23. The station has also moved its virtual channel to 23 to match its RF channel.

References

External links

Television channels and stations established in 1993
1993 establishments in Virginia
MDV-LD
Independent television stations in the United States
Low-power television stations in the United States